The 1952–53 season was Manchester City's 51st season of competitive football and 36th season in the top division of English football. In addition to the First Division, the club competed in the FA Cup.

First Division

League table

Results summary

References

External links

Manchester City F.C. seasons